Senator Watt may refer to:

Alexander Watt (politician) (1834–1914), Washington State Senate
Mel Watt (born 1945), North Carolina State Senate
William Watt (miner) (1828–1878), California State Senate

See also
Senator Watts (disambiguation)